In bluegrass music, a banjo roll or roll is a pattern played by the banjo that uses a repeating eighth-note arpeggio – a broken chord – that by subdividing the beat 'keeps time'. "Each ["standard"] roll pattern is a right hand fingering pattern, consisting of eight (eighth) notes, which can be played while holding any chord position with the left hand."

"When used as back-up, the same pattern can be repeated over and over throughout an entire song, (...[with chord changes] as required), or the roll patterns can be combined with one another and with [back-up licks]... The roll patterns can also be used to embellish the vamping style of back-up, especially when the chords are played high... These roll patterns can be used as back-up for any song played at any tempo." The banjo is commonly played in open tunings, such as open G (as are all of the examples): G'DGBD', allowing rolls to be practiced on all open strings (without fretting). Rolls are a distinguishing characteristic of Scruggs style banjo playing, with older styles being more melodic. The older style of banjo playing has been described as "in 'phrases,'" and with, "really no connective tissue between four notes and next four notes...sorta like a gallop. Snuffy [Jenkins] was a little like that...old sounding, choppy...".

Banjo rolls serve a variety of functions within an ensemble:

Earl Scruggs is known for being the pioneer of banjo picking. Scruggs grew up in a musical family where his parents and siblings all played instruments including the guitar, piano, fiddle and the organ. Scruggs began playing the banjo at the age of 5, by the age of 10 he perfected three-string-plucking on a 5 string banjo now known as “Scruggs-Style”. When Scruggs was 21 he began playing with Bill Monroe group called Blue Grass Boys which is where the term “bluegrass music” comes from. Later on, Monroe and Scruggs launched The Foggy Mountain Boys.

The four essential 5-string banjo rolls

The forward roll: this is the simplest roll on the banjo, just as the name says, you roll your fingers forward and away from you across the strings. This banjo roll is made up of eight movements.

The reverse or backward roll: In order to play this roll correctly you want grasp onto the strings then forward toll then reverse the order in which you play the 1st and 2nd strings.

The Forward-Reverse Roll: The 5 string banjo roll typically will only use four out of 5 strings, also other than using just 3 that are used to play the forward and backward rolls.

The mixed roll: The mixed roll is also known by the names of ‘the thumb-in-and-out’ or ‘alternating thumb’ roll, this pattern is neither ascending or descending. This roll technique also uses all 5 strings. Also, the thumb will play every other note.

"The word roll has different meanings for different kinds of musicians. To guitar players, a roll is a broken chord; to bluegrass-banjo players..."

Rolls may start at any point in the pattern or, in other words, on any finger.

See also
"Shave and a Haircut"
G run
Chop chord
Crosspicking
Drum roll

Sources

Bluegrass music
String performance techniques